Som Dutt Battu (born 11 April 1938) is a Shimla-based Hindustani classical vocalist of the Patiala Gharana. He was a winner of the civilian honour of Himachal Gaurav. He is also a member of Empanelment Committee for Hindustani Music at Indian Council for Cultural Relations New Delhi.

Early life and background 

Born in a family of musicians, Som Dutt Battu was initiated into Hindustani vocal music by his father Ram Lal Battu, a follower of the Sham Chaurasia gharana. He received training in music from Kunj Lal Sharma, a disciple of Vishnu Digambar Paluskar. He also learnt the techniques of the gayaki (singing style) of Patiala gharana from Kundan Lal Sharma, a noted disciple of Ashique Ali Khan.

Writer 
Indian Institute of Advanced Studies published ‘MAN AND MUSIC IN INDIA’ in the year 1992; in this work some research papers including Battu's were published.

Awards 
 Life Time Achievement and Param Sabhayachar Samman Award by Punjabi Academy New Delhi, Government of Delhi.
 Punjab Sangeet Rattan Award.

References 

1938 births
Living people
20th-century Indian male classical singers
Indian musicologists
20th-century Khyal singers